Tagged (stylized as T@gged) is an American teen psychological thriller web and streaming television series, starring Lia Marie Johnson, Lulu Antariksa, and Katelyn Nacon. The series is produced by AwesomenessTV. The first season premiered on July 19, 2016 on go90, with the second season premiering on go90 on May 9, 2017. The third season was released via streaming on Hulu on December 7, 2018.

Plot
T@gged follows three high school girls, Hailey (Lia Marie Johnson), Rowan (Lulu Antariksa), and Elisia (Katelyn Nacon), whose online profiles get tagged in violent videos. Their social media profiles clue someone in on a lot of things about them, including where they live. The only way to save their lives is to figure out who's doing this, before the killer gets to them first. The thriller series T@gged takes the issue of privacy to the extreme and shows what happens when your social media profile falls into the wrong hands.

Cast

 Lia Marie Johnson as Hailey (seasons 1–2; guest, season 3)
 Lulu Antariksa as Rowan
 Katelyn Nacon as Elisia
 Timothy Granaderos as Ash 
 Tristin Mays as Brie (season 1; main for one episode of season 3)
 Danielle Savre as Ms. Dawson (seasons 1–2)
 Brendan Meyer as Eric/Dunbar Rakes (season 1; guest, season 2; main for one episode of season 3)
 Nick Fink as Jake
 Lukas Gage as Brandon
 Kurt Caceres as Fricks
 Claudia Sulewski as Nicki
 JC Caylen as Sean
 Rajiv Dhall as Stinger (seasons 2–3)
 Braeden Lemasters as Trevor (seasons 2–3)
 Noah Centineo as Hawk (seasons 2–3)
 Emma Dumont as Zoe (seasons 2–3)
 Hana Hayes as Tessa (season 3)
 Fivel Stewart as Jai (season 3)
 Chelsea Lopez as Alison (season 3)
 Ava Capri as Olive (season 3)

Production
In September 2016, it was announced that T@gged was renewed for a second season, slated for a 2017 premiere. On May 1, 2017, before the season 2 premiere, AwesomenessTV announced that they had renewed T@gged for a third season. The third season was released on December 7, 2018 on Hulu, after go90 was shut down by Verizon.

Filming
T@gged was filmed in New Mexico. Production for the first season began in early 2016. The second season began production in September 2016. Production for the third season began in October 2017 and wrapped in December 2017.

Episodes

Season 1 (2016)

Season 2 (2017)

Season 3 (2018)

References

External links
 

Awesomeness (company)
2016 web series debuts
Television series about social media
Television shows filmed in New Mexico